Nothobranchius milvertzi is a species of seasonal killifish in the family Nothobranchiidae. This species is endemic to northern Zambia. It is known only from the area of the type locality - ephemeral pools formed on the floodplain and in the seasonal riverbeds of the Lushiba Marsh in the Lake Mweru basin, Luapula Province, northern Zambia.

Sources

Links
 Nothobranchius milvertzi on WildNothos

milvertzi
Fish described in 2014
Fish of the Democratic Republic of the Congo